Phaulernis africana is a moth in the family Epermeniidae. It was described by Reinhard Gaedike in 2013. It is found in Kenya and Tanzania.

References

Moths described in 2013
Epermeniidae
Lepidoptera of Kenya
Lepidoptera of Tanzania